Macon City Hall serves as the seat of government for the city of Macon, Georgia, in the United States. It is located in the downtown area, surrounded by Cotton Avenue, First Street, Poplar Street, and D.T. Walton, Sr. Way. It is located diagonally across the street from the Macon City Auditorium.

The Classical Revival structure was built in 1837 as the headquarters of the Monroe Railroad & Banking Co., before later serving as City Hall. During the American Civil War it was called into duty as a military hospital beginning in 1863. Its greatest notoriety came the next year, when  Governor Joseph E. Brown, fleeing the Union army's advance into Milledgeville, moved the state capital to Macon and set up an office at City Hall, beginning November 18, 1864. The General Assembly met in the building the following February and March, the last legislative session under the Confederate States of America. The building ceased to serve as capitol on March 11, 1865.

Currently, City Hall houses city administrative offices, including that of the mayor and police department. City Council chambers are also located within the building. An eternal flame burns on the Poplar Street side of the building at the foot of the two grand staircases that flank the building's white-columned portico.

External links
City Hall & Old Capitol State Historical Marker

Macon, Georgia
Buildings and structures in Macon, Georgia